Lechia is a small genus of Asian jumping spiders first described by Marek Michal Zabka in 1985.  it contains only two species: L. minuta and L. squamata.

See also
 Laufeia
 List of Salticidae genera

References

Further reading

Salticidae genera
Spiders of Asia